Vasil Vasilev may refer to:

Vasil Vasilev (footballer, born 1984), footballer, playing for PFC Botev Plovdiv
Vasil Vasilev (footballer, born 1976), footballer, playing for FC Malesh Mikrevo